Ristijärvi is a municipality of Finland.

It is part of the Kainuu region. The municipality is unilingually Finnish.

People born in Ristijärvi
Salomo Pulkkinen, Member of Parliament
Kari Härkönen, cross country skier
Hannu Takkula, Member of the European Parliament
Kaisa Mäkäräinen, biathlete

References

External links
 
 Municipality of Ristijärvi – Official website, finnish, english and german

 
Municipalities of Kainuu
Populated places established in 1867